Teofila Działyńska (Szołdrska-Potulicka) (1714-1790), was a Polish landowner. She was a powerful local landowner and magnate. In history, she has become famous in literature as for the many ghost legends and myths in folklore, that surrounded her after her death.

References

 Jan Seredyka, Księżniczka i chudopachołek , Wyd. Uniwersytetu Opolskiego, Opole 1995,  .

18th-century Polish women
1790 deaths
1714 births
18th-century women landowners
18th-century Polish–Lithuanian landowners